5185 Alerossi, provisional designation , is a background asteroid from the central region of the asteroid belt, approximately  in diameter. It was discovered on 15 September 1990, by American astronomer Henry Holt at Palomar Observatory in California, United States. The asteroid was later named for Italian geodesist Alessandro Rossi.

Orbit and classification 

Alerossi is a non-family asteroid from the main belt's background population. It orbits the Sun in the central asteroid belt at a distance of 2.5–2.9 AU once every 4 years and 5 months (1,599 days; semi-major axis of 2.68 AU). Its orbit has an eccentricity of 0.08 and an inclination of 8° with respect to the ecliptic.

Naming 

This minor planet was named after Italian geodesists Alessandro Rossi (born 1964), a member of the "Group of Satellite Flight Dynamics" at the Istituto CNECE in Pisa, Italy. Expert in space geodesy and participant in the Laser Geodynamics Satellites (LAGEOS) mission, he examines Earth's artificial orbital debris, the natural debris around mission targets to improve space-craft maneuvers, and the potential hazard of Earth-crossers. The official naming citation was published by the Minor Planet Center on 28 July 1999.

Physical characteristics 

According to the surveys carried out by the Infrared Astronomical Satellite IRAS and NASA's Wide-field Infrared Survey Explorer with its subsequent NEOWISE mission, Alerossi measures 12.9 and 13.3 kilometers in diameter and its surface has an albedo of 0.08 and 0.14, respectively. It has an absolute magnitude of 12.6. As of 2018, the asteroid's spectral type, rotation period and shape remain unknown.

References

External links 
 Dictionary of Minor Planet Names, Google books
 Discovery Circumstances: Numbered Minor Planets (5001)-(10000) – Minor Planet Center
 
 

005185
Discoveries by Henry E. Holt
Named minor planets
19900915